Johann Friedrich Wilhelm Wolff, nicknamed "Lupus" (21 June 1809 – 9 May 1864) was a German schoolmaster, political activist and publicist.

Life
Wolff was born in Tarnau, Kreis Schweidnitz, Silesia (now Tarnawa, Lower Silesian Voivodeship, Gmina Żarów, Poland) in to a family of farmers. In 1831 he became active as a radical student organization member, for which he was imprisoned between 1834 and 1838.

In 1846, in Brussels, Wolff became a close friend of Karl Marx and Friedrich Engels. He was active in the Brussels Communist Correspondence Committee and a member of the League of the Just in addition to being co-founder of the League of Communists in 1848 as a member of its central authority. He served as an editor of the Neue Rheinische Zeitung in 1848-1849 and as a member of the Frankfurt National Assembly. 

Wolff emigrated to Switzerland in 1849 and then to England in 1851.

Legacy
On his death, Wolff left a substantial fortune to Marx, who dedicated the first volume of Das Kapital to him with the line "To my unforgettable friend, Wilhelm Wolff. Intrepid, faithful, noble protagonist of the proletariat."

According to American economics Professor Richard D. Wolff, Wilhelm Wolff is one of Richard Wolff's distant relatives.

Gerhart Hauptmann's play Die Weber (The Weavers) is based on Wolff's essay about the weavers' uprising in Silesia in 1844 and its suppression, Das Elend und der Aufuhr in Schlesien.

References

External links
 Archive of Wilhelm Wolff Papers at the International Institute of Social History
 Frederick Engels, 1876. Wilhelm Wolff biography

1809 births
1864 deaths
German communists
German socialists
Members of the Frankfurt Parliament
People from Zielona Góra County
People from the Province of Silesia
People from Żarów